The 1971 All-Ireland Intermediate Hurling Championship was the 11th staging of the All-Ireland hurling championship. The championship ended on 19 September 1971.

Antrim were the defending champions, however, they were defeated in the provincial championship. Tipperary won the title after defeating Wicklow by 3-16 to 3-13 in the final.

References

Intermediate
All-Ireland Intermediate Hurling Championship